Euhadra peliomphala is a species of air-breathing land snail, a terrestrial pulmonate gastropod mollusk in the family Bradybaenidae.

This species is endemic to Japan. The species exhibits exceptional geographical variation in its mitochondrial DNA.

Subspecies
Euhadra peliomphala has 4 subspecies:
 Euhadra peliomphala kunoensis Kuroda in Masuda & Habe, 1989
 Euhadra peliomphala nimbosa (Crosse, 1868)
 Euhadra peliomphala peliomphala (Pfeiffer, 1850)
 Euhadra peliomphala simodae (Jay, 1856)

Hormonal control
As Euhadra peliomphala matures sexually, it develops a "head-wart" between the optic tentacles. The development of the "head-wart" parallels the development of the snail's reproductive system. The "head-wart" releases the steroid hormone, testosterone, throughout the body before mating.

References

External links
 Information and images of Euhadra peliomphala

peliomphala
Gastropods described in 1850